Lunna Ness is a peninsula in the north east of Mainland, Shetland, Scotland , in the parish of Lunnasting near Vidlin. The island of Lunna Holm is nearby. The Shetland Bus operation during World War II used this area as a base.

The  Stanes of Stofast is a 2,000 tonne glacial erratic that came to rest on a prominent hilltop.

The Lunnasting stone is a monolith bearing an ogham inscription discovered in the area and donated to the National Museum of Antiquities of Scotland in 1876. It was found by Rev. J.C. Roger in a cottage, who stated that the stone had been unearthed from a "moss" (i.e. a peat bog) in April 1876, having been originally discovered five feet (1.5 m) below the surface.

Lunna Ness is a Site of Special Scientific Interest based on the abundance of the otter population.

Lunna House is a 17th-century laird's house, noted for having "the best historic designed landscape in Shetland". In the 20th century it was used as a base of the wartime Shetland Bus operation.

Notes

References
 Schei, Liv Kjørsvik (2006) The Shetland Isles. Grantown-on-Spey. Colin Baxter Photography. 

Landforms of Shetland
Peninsulas of Scotland
Mainland, Shetland